Ivan Grabovac (born 8 March 1995) is a Croatian football player, who currently plays for Austrian lower league side SV Flavia Solva.

Club career
He made his Austrian Football First League debut for Kapfenberger SV on 15 August 2017 in a game against SC Wiener Neustadt.

On 29 January 2019, Grabovac joined ASK Mochart Köflach. He left the club at the end of the year and joined TUS Heiligenkreuz am Waasen.

References

External links
 
 

1995 births
Living people
Footballers from Zagreb
Association football central defenders
Croatian footballers
Croatia youth international footballers
NK Inter Zaprešić players
NK Rudeš players
HNK Segesta players
NK Hrvatski Dragovoljac players
Kapfenberger SV players
First Football League (Croatia) players
2. Liga (Austria) players
Austrian 2. Landesliga players
Austrian Landesliga players
Croatian expatriate footballers
Expatriate footballers in Austria
Croatian expatriate sportspeople in Austria